Oosterhout is a municipality in the province North Brabant in the Netherlands.

Oosterhout may also refer to:

Places
 Oosterhout, a hamlet in the municipality of Overbetuwe in the Netherlands
 Oosterhout Abbey, St. Paul's Abbey in Oosterhout
 Oosterhout Formation, in the central and south area of the Netherlands

People
 Chimène van Oosterhout (born 1964), Dutch TV personality, actress, and singer
 Martin Donald Van Oosterhout (1900–1979), American legislator and state court judge
 Pim van Boetzelaer van Oosterhout (1892–1986), Dutch diplomat and politician

See also
 Osterhout
 Ousterhout